Carlo Alessandro, Principe della Torre e Tasso, 3rd Duke of Castel Duino (born 10 February 1952) is the current head of the Castel Duino branch of the House of Thurn and Taxis.

Family
Carlo Alessandro is the only child of Raimundo, 2nd Duke of Castel Duino and his wife Princess Eugénie of Greece and Denmark. He was born in Neuilly-sur-Seine, Île-de-France, France.

He is a maternal second cousin of Charles III, King of Great Britain, through their shared great-grandparents, King George I and Queen Olga of Greece, born a Grand Duchess of Russia.

Marriage and issue
Carlo Alessandro married Veronique Lantz, daughter of Gérard Lantz and his wife, Monique Rachet, on 10 February 1976 in Saint-Tropez, Provence-Alpes-Côte d'Azur, France. Carlo Alessandro and Veronique have three children:

 Prince Dimitri della Torre e Tasso (born 24 November 1977) m. 2017 Jonkvrouw Elinor de Pret Roose de Calesberg (*1981)
 Prince Alexandre della Torre e Tasso (b. 2017)
 Prince Louis della Torre e Tasso (b. 2019)
 Prince Maximilian della Torre e Tasso (born 22 May 1979)
 Princess Constanza della Torre e Tasso (born 7 August 1989)

Carlo Alessandro and his family currently reside at Duino Castle in the Province of Trieste, Italy.

Ancestry

References

External links

Napoleon Series

1952 births
Living people
People from Neuilly-sur-Seine
Dukes of Castel Duino
Princes of Thurn und Taxis
Italian Roman Catholics